The Howlett Line was a critical Confederate earthworks dug during the Bermuda Hundred Campaign of the United States Civil War in May 1864. Specifically, the line stretched across the Bermuda Hundred peninsula from the James River to the Appomattox River. It was named for the Dr. Howlett's House that overlooked the James River at the north end of the line. The Howlett Line became famous as the "Cork in the Bottle" by keeping  the 30,000-man strong General Butler's Army of the James at bay.

History
Following the Battle of Ware Bottom Church (May 20, 1864), the confederates began digging a decisive set of defensive earthworks that became known as the Howlett Line. It continued for three miles from river to river and aimed to hold down the railroad and turnpike of crucial importance, which connected Richmond and Petersburg that were at the time slightly defended. Gen. Daniel H. Hill directed the construction of the Confederate fortifications.

In Personal Memoirs Gen. Ulysses S. Grant described a conversation with his Chief Engineer Gen. John G. Barnard regarding Butler's predicament:

Battery Dantzler, called Howlett's Battery before it was renamed to honor Col. Olin M. Dantzler of the 22nd South Carolina, and Parker's Virginia Battery anchored the Howlett Line. During the Second Battle of Petersburg (June 15, 1864) Gen. P. G. T. Beauregard pulled part of the troops from the Howlett Line to reinforce his main defenses. Overall, the construction of Confederate fortifications and trenches known as the Howlett Line held Butler in place until General Robert E. Lee evacuated the position on April 2, 1865.

Preservation
The Chesterfield Historical Society of Virginia works on preservation of the extant earthworks in the Howlett Line Park, which belongs to the Chesterfield County Parks System.

See also
 Richmond National Battlefield Park
 Troop engagements of the American Civil War, 1864

References

External links
 The Civil War in Chesterfield County: The Howlett LIne

Military installations in Virginia
Fortifications in the United States
Fortification lines
Virginia in the American Civil War
1864 establishments in Virginia